Eudalio Eulises Arriaga Blandón (born 19 September 1975) is a former Colombian footballer that played as a forward.

Career
Born in Turbo, Antioquia, Arriaga began playing professional football with Envigado. He made his league debut under manager Gabriel Jaime Gómez, appearing as a second-half substitute against Deportivo Cali on 23 March 1995. He would score his first league goal against América de Cali on 11 March 1996.

Arriaga played for a number of clubs in Colombia including Junior where he played over 100 games. He has also played in Mexico with Puebla, Barcelona Sporting Club in Ecuador, Danubio of Uruguay and Universidad San Martín of Peru. He is famous for his particular running gait, as one of his legs is shorter than the other, akin to football legend Garrincha, which made several narrators call him "Bamboleo" (wobble).

Arriaga played 14 times for the Colombia national team between 2001 and 2004. In 2001 he was part of the Colombia squad that won their first ever Copa América.

International goals
Colombia score listed first, score column indicates score after each Arriaga goal.

Titles

References

External links
 

1975 births
Living people
Footballers from Barranquilla
Colombian footballers
Association football forwards
Colombia international footballers
2001 Copa América players
2003 FIFA Confederations Cup players
Categoría Primera A players
Uruguayan Primera División players
Liga MX players
Envigado F.C. players
Atlético Junior footballers
Barcelona S.C. footballers
Once Caldas footballers
Club Puebla players
Danubio F.C. players
Atlético Bucaramanga footballers
Club Deportivo Universidad de San Martín de Porres players
Cúcuta Deportivo footballers
Expatriate footballers in Ecuador
Expatriate footballers in Mexico
Expatriate footballers in Peru
Expatriate footballers in Uruguay
Copa América-winning players